Flamenco Falsetas is the second and final studio album by Australian duo Dickson Martinez, made up of Juan Martinez and Peter Dickson. The album was released in December 1996 and peaked at number 53 on the ARIA Charts.

Track listing
 "The Mystery" - 5:34
 "Tangos" - 3:59
 "For Dad" - 3:10
 "Cedro" - 7:19
 "Burla" - 3:35
 "Himalayan Descent" - 3:41
 "Mafioza" - 5:37
 "Mar Salis" - 5:13
 "Debra" - 4:59
 "Peacock Parade" - 5:17

Charts

References

1996 albums